Davor Magoč (born 14 May 1986) is a Croatian football midfielder.

Club career
Born in Vukovar, he previously played for FK Vojvodina in the First League of Serbia and Montenegro, in Hungarian Budapest Honvéd FC and in Swedish Nordvärmlands FF.

References

External links
 
 Davor Magoč at Srbijafudbal 
 Davor Magoč at RFK Novi Sad official website

1986 births
Living people
Sportspeople from Vukovar
Association football midfielders
Croatian footballers
FK Vojvodina players
FK ČSK Čelarevo players
Budapest Honvéd FC players
RFK Novi Sad 1921 players
First League of Serbia and Montenegro players
Serbian First League players
Nemzeti Bajnokság I players
Division 3 (Swedish football) players
Serbian SuperLiga players
Croatian expatriate footballers
Expatriate footballers in Serbia and Montenegro
Croatian expatriate sportspeople in Serbia and Montenegro
Expatriate footballers in Serbia
Croatian expatriate sportspeople in Serbia
Expatriate footballers in Hungary
Croatian expatriate sportspeople in Hungary
Expatriate footballers in Sweden
Croatian expatriate sportspeople in Sweden